Nauru took part in the 2010 Commonwealth Games in Delhi, sending six athletes to compete in boxing and weightlifting. Nauru has won medals in every edition of the Commonwealth Games since it first took part in 1990, and in particular won fifteen medals in weightlifting at the 2002 Games in Manchester.

In 2010, Nauruans won two medals, a gold and a silver, both in weightlifting. Yukio Peter won gold in the men's 77 kg category, setting a new Commonwealth Games record by lifting 148 kg in the snatch and 185 kg in the clean and jerk – 333 kg in total. In the men's 105+ kg, Itte Detenamo won silver. He lifted 179 kg in the snatch and 218 kg in the clean and jerk – 397 kg in total. This equalled the total lifted by Australia's Damon Kelly, but Kelly won gold by virtue of a lesser body weight, leaving Detenamo with silver.

Medals

Medalists

Boxing

Nauru sent 4 boxers.
 Colan Caleb
 Joseph Deireragea
 Lad Agege
 Jake Ageidu

Weightlifting

Weightlifting is Nauru's strongest sport. Yukio Peter won the island's 10th Commonwealth gold.

Men

See also
 2010 Commonwealth Games

References

External links
 Team Nauru 2010 results on the website of the Nauruan government
 Photograph of Yukio Peter watching Nauru's flag being raised during his medal ceremony (Nauru government website)

Nations at the 2010 Commonwealth Games
Nauru at the Commonwealth Games
2010 in Nauruan sport